Haliophyle connexa is a moth of the family Noctuidae. It was first described by William Warren in 1912. It is endemic to the island of Hawaii.

External links

Hadeninae
Endemic moths of Hawaii